The Mount McKinley-class command ship was a ship class of command ships of the United States Navy during World War II and the Cold War. All eight ships were converted from Type C2-S-AJ1 cargo ships.

Development 
Eight type C2 cargo ships were converted into command ships for the US Navy throughout the middle to later stages of World War II. After the war, all were modernized with new radars and all decommissioned by the 1970s to be later scrapped.

The ship's hull remained nearly the same but with new equipment to carry out her purpose now placed on deck alongside several cranes. The ships' armaments had been slightly changed and relocated in order for the ships to carry out their new roles. All ships served in the Pacific Theater until the end of the war with no ships lost in combat.

Ships in the class

References

External links
Amphibious Force Command Ship (AGC) photo gallery
United States Navy. 1959-1991. Dictionary of American Naval Fighting Ships.
Worth, Richard. 2001. Fleets of World War II. Da Capo Press.
2002. U.S. Amphibious Ships and Craft: An Illustrated Design History. Annapolis: Naval Institute Press. .

Ships built in Wilmington, North Carolina
Command ships of the United States Navy
Auxiliary ship classes of the United States Navy
World War II auxiliary ships of the United States
Cold War amphibious warfare vessels of the United States
Mount McKinley-class command ships